Cumilla Cadet College (CCC) is a residential military high school and college in Cumilla, Bangladesh, for boys in grades 7 to 12. Several times in recent years it has placed among the top ten schools in its region in terms of student performance.

History
Cumilla Cadet College (CCC) was created on 1 July 1983 by converting Cumilla Residential Model School, a government boarding school that had been established on the site in 1966. CCC formally opened on 7 April 1984 under founding principal Lt. Col. Nurul Anwar, with 150 cadets in three intakes. In the months that followed, three more intakes brought it to full enrollment.

Campus
It is near the Buddhist archaeological site Shalban Vihara, Bangladesh Academy for Rural Development (BARD), and Cumilla University.

The college covers an area of 50.74 acres. This includes a huge Academic Block which is commonly known as Bir Sreshtho Captain Mohiuddin Jahangir Academic Block whose façade faces The Basket Ball Ground which is adjacent to Cumilla University Road. Adjacent to this block is the College Library Bir Sreshtho Munshi Abdur Rouf and the Computer Lab and also the Bir Sreshtho Mostafa Kamal Auditorium.

The College Administration Block which is just beside the Academic Block houses the office of the Principal and other supporting offices. The college has a beautiful mosque just in the middle of the Campus and a decently equipped Bir Sreshtho Nur Mohammad Sheikh hospital in front of the mosque as well.
Just beside the Administration Block, The college has big playing fields which offer opportunity to almost 300 cadets at a time. The games played on these grounds include: cricket, hockey, football, basketball, volleyball. 
The Cadets Dormitory is standing at the south,  near College Central Playground. Each House accommodates 100 cadets. Beside the mosque and in front of the Cadet house, in the lap of Lalmai Hill, the Cadet Mess, Birsreshtho Flight lieutenant Matiur Rahman lies. It consists of a big hall with outstanding interior design.
Near the second gate of college, there is a majestic newly built college cafeteria which provides delicious dishes. Besides that there is a college bakery just behind the mess. On the far end of Academics Block, there lie the Brand New swimming pool and Squash Court with all sort modern facilities. Post office and banking facilities are also available in the college campus.

In two different corner of the college there lie a guest house and a rest house, namely Oporajta  &  Parijat. Most of the part of the college campus is covered with small hills with numerous trees. There is sufficient space for the accommodation of the Cadets, Faculty Members, and other members of the college. The carefully maintained flowerbeds and vegetation provide a refreshing hue.

Houses
The college has a three storied building for the accommodation of the cadets. A total number of three houses are there where each floor comprises one house. Each house hosts about 100 cadets. It is supervised by a House Master, an Assistant House Master and twelve House Tutors. Each house hasseven latest computers with hi-speed internet WIFI connection. The facilities of washing; ironing & cleaning are available to all the cadets. There is a recreation room in each house which allows the cadets to enjoy movie show in a wide screen with home theatre system. Besides, there is an indoor games room in each house comprises pool-table, dart board, table-tennis board, foosball and carom. Each house is given a symbol, colour and a motto. The epaulettes worn by the cadets signifies their house through their colors. The houses are named after three rivers of the local rivers

Meghna House: 
House Color: "Blue".
House Symbol: "Tiger".
House Motto: "Work is Life".
Gomati House: 
House Color: "Red".
House Symbol: "Eagle".
House Motto: "Truth is Beauty".
 Titas House:  
 House Color: "Green".
 House Symbol: "Lion".
 House Motto: "Character is power".

The cadets from three houses take part in extra and co-curricular competitions each year. The competitions vary from games and sports to cultural activities, painting, gardening and also academics. Each competition provides the house points according to their position. The house gaining highest points overall is awarded an Overall Championship trophy at the end of the year. These competitions develops not only individual qualities like Sportsmanship, Public Speaking, Leadership and others but also teach them Teamwork and Cooperation as they have to go through each competition as a member of the house. Construction work of new building for this three houses has been started and very soon it will be completed.

Curriculum
Cadet colleges are under the control of Army Headquarters. CCC is a  school & College for both boys and girls((not mixed)). Admission starts from seventh grade. At the end of tenth grade, cadets sit the Secondary School Certificate (SSC) examination. Those who pass have the option of continuing into eleventh and twelfth grades.

Students take their SSC and Higher Secondary (School) Certificate (HSC) examinations under the Board of Intermediate and Secondary Education, Cumilla. Of the schools under this board, CCC placed among the top ten in terms of SSC and/or HSC results from early 1990s till date.

Alumni association 
The Association of Cumilla Old Cadets (ACOC) was established in 1986 by ex-cadets of the first intake. You can visit the website of ACOC in www.acoc.group and collect informations about any ex-cadets.

Notable alumni 
 James Leo Ferguson, A Bangladeshi freedom fighter of Scottish origin and tea industrialist who graduated in 1971.
 Major General Md Jubayer Salehin, E in C, Bangladesh Army.

See also
List of Educational Institutions in Cumilla

References

External links

Cadet colleges in Bangladesh
Cumilla District
Military high schools
Boys' schools in Bangladesh
1983 establishments in Bangladesh
Educational institutions established in 1983
Educational Institutions affiliated with Bangladesh Army